During the Middle Ages in Europe, Egyptian days were certain days of the year held to be unlucky. The Egyptian days were:
January 1, 25 
February 4, 26 
March 1, 28 
April 10, 20
May 3, 25 
June 10, 16 
July 13, 22 
August 1, 30 
September 3, 21 
October 3, 22 
November 5, 28 
December 7, 22

These were days considered unlucky to begin any enterprise. Physicians were especially discouraged from performing bloodletting on the Egyptian days.

See also
Tycho Brahe days

Notes

Bibliography
 
 
 
 
 

European folklore
Luck
Unofficial observances
Superstitions

nl:Egyptische dagen